Daniel Zygla (born April 24, 1990) is an professional former German darts player who currently plays in the British Darts Organisation events.

He won 3 regional tournaments in Germany since 2016, the Kirchheim Classic and the Kirchheim Open in 2016, and the Dinslaken Open in 2017.

References

External links
Profile and stats on Darts Database

1990 births
Living people
German darts players
People from Stade (district)
Sportspeople from Lower Saxony